Don't Deliver Us from Evil is a 1971 French horror drama film directed by Joël Séria, in his directorial debut, and starring Jeanne Goupil, Catherine Wagener, and Bernard Dhéran. It follows two Catholic schoolgirls in France who are drawn toward increasingly evil deeds. It is loosely based on the Parker–Hulme murder case of 1954.

The film was controversial upon release due to its depiction of adolescent crime and sexuality, receiving an X rating in the United Kingdom and being banned in its native France.

Plot
Anne de Boissy and Lore Fournier are two adolescent Angevin girls who stay at a Catholic boarding school. Both have affluent and conservative families living in the countryside. Anne and Lore quickly become friends. They spend most of their time reading poems about the beauty of death, mocking their classmates and teachers, and engaging in vicious pranks and petty theft, believing that not only is church downright fatuous, but also for idiots, as well as that the both of them together are special, and untouchable—a fact that seems more and more true to them with each passing day when they manage to escape detection and punishment by usually blaming it on their fellow peers.

When Anne's parents take a long trip and leave Anne behind during summer vacation, Lore secretly moves into their château with Anne, where they become lovers and their insidious pranks escalate. The girls set fire to the home of the local cowherd, Émile, and let his cows loose as punishment for his sexual leering over schoolgirls. They also kill all the pet birds of their school's mentally handicapped groundskeeper, Léon, as well as ripping up his clothes and burning some of his personal belongings just to make him suffer. Then afterwards, laugh at his expense. Stealing sacramental bread and traditional priest uniforms from the church, the girls prepare the abandoned chapel at the château for a Black Mass in which they wed themselves to Satan, promising more wicked works in his name, even cutting both of their fingers and joining each other's blood so that their bond will become stronger.

One night, a motorist runs out of gasoline near the château. The girls invite him in, offer him alcohol, and begin to behave seductively toward him. The man attempts to rape Lore and Anne bludgeons him to death in Lore's defense. The two dispose of the motorist's body by dumping it in the lake, and immediately grow fearful of being caught.

Police later find the motorist's abandoned car and suspect foul play. A detective arrives at the château to inquire if the motorist stopped there, but is suspicious when the girls behave nervously and refuse to tell them where their parents are. The girls in turn become convinced that the detective knows what they have done and plan a suicide pact, convinced they will go to Hell and be rewarded by Satan for their service. At a school recital, the girls read out loud a rather grim yet equally eloquent poem by Baudelaire. The nuns become increasingly suspicious as to what Anne and Lore are up to, since they have no idea what the girls are plotting, or of their secret suicide pact. However they are too late to interfere in what is unfolding, and everyone in the room is engrossed with the girls' performance. After reading the poem, while members in the audience start to both cheer and clap in applause, both girls cover their clothes with petrol and set themselves ablaze. The audience, including the girls' parents, panic and rush for the doors as the girls burn to death on stage.

Cast

Production
The film's screenplay by writer-director Joël Séria was loosely based on the 1954 Parker–Hulme murder case in New Zealand, in which two adolescent girls—Pauline Parker and Juliet Hulme—plotted and killed Parker's mother.

Release
The film was screened as part of the Directors Fortnight at the 1971 Cannes Film Festival, It was submitted for approval by the British Board of Film Classification in December 1971 and received an X rating before being released theatrically in the United Kingdom on 7 January 1972. Despite significant cuts, the film was banned in its native France by the Ministry of Cultural Affairs, who issued the statement:  It also went unreleased theatrically in the United States. The film's controversy was utilized in its British marketing campaign, which advertised it as "The French film banned in France!"

Critical response
Patrick Gibbs of The Daily Telegraph addressed the film's controversial content, but added that, "artistically, it's beautifully done, with just the right touch of fantasy, and, as things go in the cinema these days, it's not only moral in conclusion but, I think, generally inoffensive." Critic Derek Malcolm praised the lead performances in the film, though he noted that its pacing "becomes a little too repetitive. Some of the necessary subtlety is clearly beyond [Séria]. But as a first film it is at least provoking and original."

Home media
Mondo Macabro released Don't Deliver Us from Evil on DVD in June 2006 before issuing a newly-restored 2K Blu-ray disc in February 2023.

See also
 Les Chants de Maldoror, which the girls read from and reference.
 Les Fleurs du mal, from which the girls chant various poems before dying.
 Heavenly Creatures, another film based on the same murder case.

References

Further reading
  pp. Preface

External links
 

1971 films
1971 drama films
1971 LGBT-related films
French drama films
French exploitation films
French horror films
French horror drama films
French LGBT-related films
Films à clef
Films about Catholicism
Films about child death
Films about teenagers
Film controversies in France
Films set in boarding schools
Films set in France
Films shot in France
Censored films
Lesbian-related films
Obscenity controversies in film
Teensploitation
1970s exploitation films
1970s French films
1970s French-language films
1970s horror drama films